HMS Constance was a  destroyer of the Royal Navy launched on 22 June 1944.

After the war she was allocated to the 8th Destroyer squadron for service in the Far East. This included deployments as part of United Nations operations, as part of the Korean War. She returned from the Far East and was listed for disposal in 1955. She was sold to Thos. W. Ward for scrapping at Inverkeithing, arriving there on 8 March 1956.

References

Publications
 

 

C-class destroyers (1943) of the Royal Navy
World War II destroyers of the United Kingdom
1944 ships
Korean War destroyers of the United Kingdom
Ships built on the River Tyne
Ships built by Vickers Armstrong